The twelfth season of Blue Bloods, a police procedural drama series created by Robin Green and Mitchell Burgess, premiered on CBS October 1, 2021. The season concluded on May 6, 2022 and contained 20 episodes.

Cast

Main cast 
Tom Selleck as NYPD Police Commissioner Francis "Frank" Reagan
Donnie Wahlberg as Detective 1st Grade Daniel "Danny" Reagan
Bridget Moynahan as ADA Erin Reagan
Will Estes as Sergeant Jamison "Jamie" Reagan
Len Cariou as Henry Reagan
Marisa Ramirez as Detective 1st Grade Maria Baez
Vanessa Ray as Officer Edit "Eddie" Janko-Reagan

Recurring cast 
Abigail Hawk as Detective 1st Grade Abigail Baker
Gregory Jbara as Deputy Commissioner of Public Information Garrett Moore
Robert Clohessy as Lieutenant Sidney "Sid" Gormley
Steve Schirripa as DA Investigator Anthony Abetemarco
Stacy Keach as Archbishop Kevin Kearns
Lauren Patten as Officer Rachell Witten
Will Hochman as Detective 3rd Grade Joseph "Joe" Hill
Rosyln Ruff as D.A. Kimberly "Kim" Crawford
Ian Quinlan as Officer Luis Badillo
Callie Thorne as Maggie Gibson 
Dylan Walsh as Mayor Peter Chase 
Peter Hermann as Jack Boyle
Andrew Terraciano as Sean Reagan 
Treat Williams as Lenny Ross

Episodes

Ratings

References

External links
 
 

Blue Bloods (TV series)
2021 American television seasons
2022 American television seasons